Sönmüş Ocak is a Turkish TV series which is based on Reşat Nuri Güntekin's book. The TV series premiered in 1980 on TRT 1. Its director is Okan Uysaler and its production assistant is Mustafa Şen.

Cast 
 Aytaç Arman - Remzi
 Zuhal Olcay - Nüveyre
 Bahar Öztan 
 Nuri Alço

1980 Turkish television series debuts
1980 Turkish television series endings
Turkish television series endings
Television shows set in Istanbul
Television series produced in Istanbul